Uranothauma nubifer, the black heart or black-heart branded blue, is a butterfly of the family Lycaenidae. It is found from Ethiopia to South Africa. It is also found in eastern Zaire.

The wingspan is 22–26 mm for males and 24–28 mm for females. Adults are on wing year-round, with a peak from November to February.

The larvae feed on Acacia species, including A. karroo.

Subspecies
Uranothauma nubifer nubifer (Nigeria, Cameroon, Kenya: west, central and the Teita Hills, Burundi, eastern Democratic Republic of the Congo, Tanzania, northern Zambia, Mozambique, Zimbabwe, Eswatini, South Africa: Limpopo Province, Mpumalanga, North West Province, Gauteng, KwaZulu-Natal)
Uranothauma nubifer distinctesignatus (Strand, 1911) (Ethiopia)

References

 
 

Butterflies described in 1895
Uranothauma
Butterflies of Africa